Richard Wickes (died June 29, 1776) was an officer in the Continental Navy during the American Revolutionary War. During the Battle of Turtle Gut Inlet, he was the first American casualty of the war in New Jersey.

Richard Wickes was born in Kent County, Maryland. His family home, Wickliffe, was on Eastern Neck Island.

American Revolutionary War
Richard Wickes received his commission early in the war, as did his brother Lambert. On March 28, 1776, they both began service on the newly commissioned 18-gun Reprisal. On June 10, the Committee of Secret Correspondence of Congress ordered Captain Wickes to set sail from Philadelphia, Pennsylvania and proceed to Martinique. Nancy was headed to Philadelphia with supplies loaded in the Caribbean islands of St. Thomas and St. Croix. The cargo contained several hundred kegs of gunpowder.

Late on the afternoon of June 28, Captain Wickes ordered his brother Richard to lead an armed longboat to the Nancy and tell her captain, Hugh Montgomery, to head for the shore. Lieutenant Wickes reached the Nancy soon after midnight. In the early hours of June 29, pursued by the British Orpheus and Kingfisher, the Nancy headed for the nearby Turtle Gut Inlet to run aground and salvage the cargo.  Lieutenant Wickes assisted in operations to return cannon fire and transfer the cargo ashore. By late in the morning of June 29, the British bombardment had heavily damaged the Nancy. Barry ordered the main sail wrapped around 50 pounds of gunpowder to create a long fuse running from the nearly 100 gunpowder kegs remaining in the hold to the deck and over the side. The fuse was lit as the crew abandoned ship. As the British boarded the ship, the fuse reached the hold. The gunpowder exploded with a huge blast felt for miles which killed many British.

After the explosion, Lieutenant Wickes was killed by subsequent British cannon fire. He was the only American casualty. Captain Wickes, in a letter to his brother Samuel, described how he had seen his brother die in the final four or five minutes of the battle. He was recognized for his bravery by both his brother and Captain Barry, who said that "a braver man never lived."

Legacy
Lieutenant Richard Wickes is buried at the Cold Spring Presbyterian Cemetery. A section of the cemetery, Veterans Field of Honor, is dedicated to his service "in the cause of American freedom."  There is a second memorial marker in Cape May, New Jersey.

Gallery
Cold Spring Presbyterian Cemetery

Cape May

References

Bibliography

External links

1776 deaths
United States military personnel killed in the American Revolutionary War
Continental Navy officers
People of Maryland in the American Revolution
People from Kent County, Maryland
Year of birth missing
Burials at Cold Spring Presbyterian Church